The Hainan Bawangling National Nature Reserve is a nature reserve in Changjiang County, western Hainan, China. It is home to the Hainan black crested gibbon, which is on the verge of extinction, and Hainan partridge. The total area of the reserve is 8,444.3 hectares.

It was founded in 1980.

References

Tourist attractions in Hainan
Nature reserves in Hainan